Rónald Alberto Matarrita Ulate (born 9 July 1994) is a Costa Rican professional footballer who plays as a left-back and winger for the Ukrainian club Dnipro-1 and the Costa Rica national team.

Club career

New York City FC
Matarrita was signed to New York City FC from Alajuelense on 20 January 2016 for an undisclosed fee. Matarrita made his MLS debut against the Chicago Fire on 6 March 2016. He scored his first goal for New York City during a 2–0 victory over the Seattle Sounders on 25 June 2016. After a strong first season, he was named New York City's Defensive Player of the Year for 2016.

FC Cincinnati
On 29 December 2020, Matarrita was traded to FC Cincinnati in exchange for $500,000 of General Allocation Money. Matarrita was released by Cincinnati following their 2022 season.

International career
Matarrita has represented Costa Rica at under-17, under-20, under-22, and senior levels. He made his senior debut on 5 September 2015 in a friendly against Brazil. He scored his first goal for Costa Rica 6 September 2016, in a 3–1 win over Panama, in a World Cup qualification match. Matarrita was called up for the 2018 FIFA World Cup, but was ruled out of the tournament three days before Costa Rica's debut due to a harmstring injury.

Career statistics

Club

International

International goals
Costa Rica score listed first, score column indicates score after each Matarrita goal.

Personal
Matarrita earned his U.S. green card in March 2017. This status also qualifies him as a domestic player for MLS roster purposes.

Honours 
Alajuelense
 Costa Rican Primera División: 2013–14 Invierno

Individual
 CONCACAF Best XI: 2016
 MLS Team of the Week 2016: Week 6, Week 10, Week 16,

References

External links 
 Profile at FC Cincinnati

1994 births
Living people
Association football wingers
Costa Rican footballers
Costa Rica international footballers
L.D. Alajuelense footballers
New York City FC players
FC Cincinnati players
SC Dnipro-1 players
Liga FPD players
Major League Soccer players
Costa Rican expatriate footballers
Expatriate soccer players in the United States
Costa Rican expatriate sportspeople in the United States
Expatriate footballers in Ukraine
Costa Rican expatriate sportspeople in Ukraine
Copa América Centenario players
People from Alajuela
Association football fullbacks
2019 CONCACAF Gold Cup players
2021 CONCACAF Gold Cup players
2022 FIFA World Cup players